Khanpur Dam is a dam located on the Haro River in Khanpur, Khyber Pakhtunkhwa about 50 km from Islamabad. It forms Khanpur Lake, a reservoir which supplies drinking water to Islamabad and Rawalpindi and irrigation water to many of the agricultural and industrial areas surrounding the cities.

Blue-green water and tourism 

The blue -green water of dam attracts hundreds  of tourists from all over the Pakistan. Every week, between 40,000 to 50,000 tourists visit Khanpur Dam. Tourists enjoy various ground- and water-based activities, such as:
 Para Sailing
 Scuba Diving
 Cliff jumping
 Jet skiing
 Family boating
 Kayaking
 Zip-lining
 Camping
 Waketubing

Archaeological sites 

There are several excavated Buddhist archaeological sites nearby that also attract local and foreign tourists.

Bhamala Buddhist Complex 

Sculptures and heads dating back to second to fifth century AD have been discovered during excavation at Bhamala Buddhist Complex near Khanpur known as Bhamala Stupa. During excavation, precious coins of Kushan period were also found around the stupa. Bhamala archaeological site had been declared national and world heritage site located near Khanpur dam. The ruins dated back to fourth century BC. The stupa is cross-shaped and looks like an Aztec Pyramid.

Rajgan Mosque

The deserted Rajgan Mosque, locally known as the "Rajon ki Masjid", is believed to be over 100 years old. It is now only used for Eid prayers, as people use the newly-constructed mosques in the nearby areas for everyday prayers. It has a large prayer hall and a time-worn brick courtyard in need of restoration and rehabilitation.

See also 

 List of dams and reservoirs in Pakistan
 List of power stations in Pakistan

References

External links 

Coordinates on Wikidata
Dams in Khyber Pakhtunkhwa
Dams completed in 1983
Dams in Pakistan
Hydroelectric power stations in Pakistan
[[Category:Haripur District]